Nkandla Local Municipality is an administrative area in the King Cetshwayo District of KwaZulu-Natal province in South Africa.  The town of Nkandla (seat of the municipality) is the home town of the former  President of South Africa, Jacob Zuma.

Nkandla (Enqabeni Enkulu KwaZulu) is a Zulu name for a hiding place of the Zulus a long time ago during the times of war, e.g. the Bambatha Rebellion and the Ndwandwe war from Entumeni. The warriors used the Nkandla forest as their last resort for protection from their enemies. It was very difficult to fight the warriors who were hiding in the thick and dark forest (iNkandla eMahlathi Amnyama). Most of the Zulu heroes' graves are found at Nkandla, for example, Bambatha's grave is at Nsuze.

Main places

Census 2011 

According to the first georeferenced 2011 census there are 142 places.

Census 2001 

The 2001 census divided the municipality into the following main places:

Politics 

The municipal council consists of twenty-seven members elected by mixed-member proportional representation. Fourteen councillors are elected by first-past-the-post voting in fourteen wards, while the remaining thirteen are chosen from party lists so that the total number of party representatives is proportional to the number of votes received. In the election of 3 August 2016 the Inkatha Freedom Party (IFP) won a majority of fifteen seats on the council.

The following table shows the results of the election.

References

External links

 

Local municipalities of the King Cetshwayo District Municipality